The Cabinet of Ásgeir Ásgeirsson was formed 3 June 1932.

Cabinets

Inaugural cabinet

Change (11 November 1932)

Change (14 November 1932)

Change (23 December 1932)

See also 

1932 establishments in Iceland
1934 disestablishments in Iceland
Asgeir Asgeirsson, Cabinet of
Cabinets established in 1932
Cabinets disestablished in 1934
Independence Party (Iceland)
Progressive Party (Iceland)